Beef noodle soup is a noodle soup made of stewed or braised beef, beef broth, vegetables and noodles. It exists in various forms throughout East and Southeast Asia. 

One of the oldest beef noodle soups is the Lanzhou lamian (兰州拉面) or Lanzhou beef noodle soup which was created by the Hui people of northwest China during the Tang dynasty. There are numerous beef noodle soups available in China with a higher variety in the west than the east.

Another common varietal is the red-braised beef noodle soup (紅燒牛肉麵) from Taiwan, which was first created by Sichuanese Kuomintang veterans; it is commonly known as Taiwanese beef noodle soup in English.

Other beef noodle soup varietals include Pho from Vietnam.

East Asian varieties

Lanzhou beef noodle soup

The Lanzhou beef noodle soup is the version most commonly seen in mainland China, and is a Chinese Muslim style of beef noodle, also known as clear-broth or consommé-stewed beef noodle. It often uses halal (or qingzhen) meat and contains no soy sauce, resulting in a lighter taste that may be flavoured by salt and herbs. Local lore attributes its creation with a Hui Chinese man from Lanzhou named Ma Baozi. In Lanzhou, capital of Gansu, Lanzhou Beef Lamian is usually served with clear soup and one hand-pulled lamian noodle per bowl. In halal restaurants, only quality local beef from the Southern Yellow cattle prepared by the local halal butcher is used for the beef noodle. Chinese radish and the specially cooked spicy oil are also indispensable partners to Lanzhou beef noodles.  These ingredients are known as "One Clear, Two White, Three Red, Four Green, Five Yellow", referring to clear soup, white radish, red chili oil, green leek and yellow noodles respectively. In overseas Chinese communities in North America, this food can be found in Chinese restaurants. In Mainland China, a large bowl of it is often taken as a whole meal with or without any side dish.

Taiwanese beef noodle soup

Taiwanese beef noodle soup is a noodle soup dish originating from Taiwan. It is sometimes referred to as "Sichuan Beef Noodle Soup" (四川牛肉麵), especially in Taiwan. Although this usage can create confusion as Sichuan has its own versions of beef noodle soups which may be sold at Sichuanese restaurants under the same name. The beef is often stewed with the broth and simmered, sometimes for hours. Chefs also let the stock simmer for long periods with bone marrow; some vendors can cook the beef stock for over 24 hours. In Taiwan, beef noodle vendors may also have optional, often cold side dishes, such as braised dried tofu, seaweed or pork intestine. Beef noodles are often served with suan cai (Chinese sauerkraut) on top, green onion and sometimes other vegetables in the soup as well.

Southeast Asian varieties 

In Thailand, kuaitiao nuea pueay is a similar dish of braised beef served with rice noodles.

In Vietnam, Bò Kho is a beef stew sometimes served with noodles (or bread as an alternative). Pho is also a Vietnamese noodle soup that contains broth, rice noodles called bánh phở, herbs and meat, primarily made with either beef (phở bò) or chicken (phở gà). In Philippines, Beef Mami is very popular and can also be combined with Pares.

Yaka mein is a type of beef noodle soup commonly found in Chinese restaurants in New Orleans. It consists of stewed beef, spaghetti noodles, hard-boiled egg and chopped green onions, with Cajun seasoning, chili powder or Old Bay-brand seasoning.

See also
 Chinese Islamic cuisine
 Chinese noodles
 Instant noodles
 List of Chinese soups
 List of noodle dishes
 List of soups
 Noodle soup
 Pho
 Ramen
 Taiwanese cuisine

References

Beef dishes
Chinese Islamic cuisine
Chinese noodle dishes
Chinese soups
National dishes
Noodle soups
Taiwanese cuisine
Tang dynasty